The Puerto Real Campus is one of the four campuses housing the University of Cádiz. It is located at the municipal limits of Puerto Real (Cádiz), together with the San Pedro river and the neighborhood of the same name.

It is located within Bahía de Cádiz Natural Park. It is well-connected with all the localities in the bay of Cádiz and several nearby (Jerez, Sanlúcar, Chipiona, Arcos and the white towns of the mountain range, accessibly by bus or commuter train.

Centers 

The Campus houses the following centers as well as coeducational research centers (UCA- Junta de Andalucía:
 Andaluz Center of Marine Science and Technology (CACYTMAR).
 Andaluz Center of Vinicultural Research (CAIV). Part of the Iberoamerican Viniculture Network
 Institutes of Microscopy and Applied Linguistics
 Faculty of Education Sciences (formerly School of Education)
 Faculty of Science
 Superior Andalusian Center for Marine Studies, which includes:
 Faculty of Nautical Sciences
 Faculty of Marine and Environmental Science
 University School of Naval Technical Engineering (previously the School of Naval Experts)
 Andaluz Center for Vinicultural Research
 Integrated Center for Information Technology
 Two teaching blocks
 Central library
 Sports pavilion

The University of Cádiz is the only university in Andalusia, and one of the few in Spain, to offer degrees in Nautical Science, Naval Technical Engineering and Oceanic Science.

The Superior School of Engineering is currently being built on land near the Campus (Las Aletas, within Bahía de Cádiz Natural Park).

The Andaluz Superior Center for Marine Studies (CASEM) is the largest building on the campus and is located at its center. It is crowned with a double-cupola, with a planetarium and a study room in its interior.

Campuses
Cádiz
Universities in Andalusia